Divine Child may refer to:

Bala Krishna
Christ Child